John Passmore Edwards M.P. (24 March 1823 – 22 April 1911) was a British journalist, newspaper owner and philanthropist, and briefly a Member of Parliament.

Early life
According to his autobiography Passmore Edwards was born in Blackwater, a small village between Redruth and Truro in Cornwall, England. He had three brothers, William, Richard and James. His father was a Cornishman, a carpenter by trade. His mother's maiden name was Passmore, and she had been born in Newton Abbot, Devon.

He reported that in his youth there were few books available to him, and they were mostly theological in nature. At age twelve, the first book he managed to purchase for himself was Newton's Opticks, and he declared that he "was just as wise at the end as I was at the beginning of reading it".

Journalist
He became the Manchester representative of the London Sentinel, a weekly newspaper opposed to the Corn Law, in 1844 but the title failed within a year and by 1845 he settled in London, supporting himself by freelance writing and lecturing in the cause of social reform.

His initial publishing ventures, including the widely read Public Good, were failures, bringing him to bankruptcy in 1853, but his 1862 purchase of The Building News and Engineering Journal (founded in 1854 as The Building News) led to profitability; this was followed by the twopenny weekly English Mechanic (subtitled and Mirror of Science and Art) and shareholding in the leading London newspaper The Echo which, in 1876, he later purchased. He eventually sold two-thirds of his share in The Echo to Andrew Carnegie to follow a political and social agenda. However, they disagreed and he bought it back and restored his editor in 1886. The paper closed in 1905.

Ebeneezer J. Kibblewhite was longtime editor of The Building News and Architectural Journal, which in 1926 merged with The Architect to become The Architect and Building News.
He was also editor of The Weekly Times and Echo (owned by Edwards) and English Mechanic.

In 1893 Edwards and Kibblewhite were, as proprietor and editor/printer of The Weekly Times and Echo sued for libel by Colonel Hughes–Hallett, Edwards's one-time rival for parliamentary honours, thus imputing malice. The offending article, published in the issue of 29 May 1892, included the words It is reported that Colonel Hughes-Hallett, formerly M.P. for Rochester, is going to honor the new Parliament with his presence if he can get returned. He should stand with Sir Charles Dilke for some double-barrelled constituency, where the electors are not particular, and then we should have a suitable champion of purity on each side of the House, in view of eventualities, Hallett and Dilke ! Sodom and Gomorrah might have been proud of such a distinguished pair of representatives.
After a review of the Colonel's misdeeds as revealed in the Pall Mall Gazette, and the admission by Kibblewhite that he was the author of the offending lines, not Edwards, the jury found for the defendants.

Politics
He was a delegate to the Peace Congresses in Brussels, Paris and Frankfurt (from 1848 to 1850). He stood as an Independent candidate for Truro in the General Election of 1868. He did not win this seat but in 1880 he gained the parliamentary seat of Salisbury for the Liberal Party.
However, he soon became somewhat sceptical about the quality of professional politics and the inability of politicians to effectively represent the interests of their constituents, and his opposition to the Second Boer War lost him some popularity.

He twice refused a knighthood.

Philanthropy

A lifelong champion of the working classes, Passmore Edwards is remembered as a generous benefactor. Over the space of 14 years, 70 major buildings were established as a direct result of his bequests. These included hospitals, 11 drinking fountains, 32 marble busts, 24 libraries, schools, convalescence homes and art galleries and the Passmore Edwards Settlement (later called the Mary Ward Centre), which was originally located at Mary Ward House on Tavistock Place. He was also a generous donor to the Workers' Educational Association. Many of Passmore Edwards' buildings were designed by the architect Maurice Bingham Adams, who was also the editor of one of his journals, Building News.

In 1898 Passmore Edwards donated substantially to the Essex Local and Educational Museum of Natural History, which was later named the Passmore Edwards Museum.

He also gave money to many hospitals including Tilbury Hospital next to Tilbury Dock Essex, where he built a ward which was named after him. Wards in Wembley Cottage Hospital and Willesden General were also named after him. He also donated his earnings to a fountain in Hoxton Square, Shoreditch, London. This fountain is regularly frequented by the local community and is considered a historical landmark in an area that finds itself becoming more and more detached from its history. Upon reading John Passmore Edward's plaque, the community believe he would smile on and embrace knowing that what he left behind was being used for the enjoyment of like-minded individuals.

Passmore Edwards was a leading Freemason, and a founder in 1906 of the Standard Chapter of Improvement, which sought to simplify and unify the incoherent rituals of the Holy Royal Arch degree. He was a teetotaller and vegetarian.

Legacy
Many of the buildings that he paid for are still in use for their original purpose. A bust of Passmore Edwards by Sir George Frampton was rescued from the basement of Hoxton Library and unveiled in May 2007 at the Passmore Edwards Library in St. Ives, Cornwall.

As well as London libraries such as at East Dulwich and Edmonton, he gave the public library buildings in Devon at Newton Abbot and in Cornwall at Bodmin, Camborne, Falmouth, Launceston, Liskeard, Penzance, Redruth, St Ives and Truro.

The Passmore Edwards Public Library in Shepherd's Bush, London, is now the home of the Bush Theatre, which moved there in October 2011.

The Passmore Edwards Public Library in Borough Road, London, has been refurbished by London South Bank University and houses the university's apprenticeships and a coffee shop.

The Epilepsy Society's main administrative office is sited at Passmore Edwards House, a Grade II listed building.

Gallery

References

Bibliography
Baynes, Peter John Passmore Edwards 1823-1911: an account of his life and works, P. A. Baynes (1995) 
Best, R. S. The Life and Good Works of John Passmore Edwards, with pen and ink illustrations by C. M. Pellow and a list of Buildings, sponsored by Edwards, their architects and opening dates, with an appendix on the architect Silvanus Trevail, [(1851–1903), who designed nine of them. Dyllansow Truran (1982) 
Burrage, E. H. J Passmore Edwards, Philanthropist (1902)
Edwards, J. Passmore A Few Footprints (1906)
Evans, Dean, "Funding the Ladder: the Passmore Edwards legacy", 2011 (Francis Boutle Publishers, London) 
Ewing, Heather, The Passmore Edwards Public Libraries in London: A Study in Patronage and the Development of a Typology, unpublished thesis (Courtauld Institute of Art, London, 1998)
MacDonald, J. J. Passmore Edwards Institutions, Strand Newspaper Company (1900)

External links

John Passmore Edwards 1823-1911 His life and Philanthropic works
Whitechapel Ghosts from Jewish Quarterly.
Passmore Edwards Institute in Hayle, Cornwall - Website - includes portrait (accessed 17 November 2007).
 , also, search under "Passmore Edwards"

1823 births
1911 deaths
People from St Agnes, Cornwall
Cornish philanthropists
British male journalists
British newspaper editors
Liberal Party (UK) MPs for English constituencies
UK MPs 1880–1885
Members of the Parliament of the United Kingdom for constituencies in Wiltshire
Members of Parliament for Salisbury